Limnaecia chromaturga is a moth in the family Cosmopterigidae. It was described by Edward Meyrick in 1915. It is found in Sri Lanka.

References

Moths described in 1915
Limnaecia
Taxa named by Edward Meyrick
Moths of Sri Lanka